"I'll Love Away Your Troubles for Awhile" is a song written by Johnny MacRae and Bob Morrison, and recorded by American country music artist Janie Fricke.  It was released in February 1979 as the second single from the album Love Notes.  The song reached #14 on the Billboard Hot Country Singles chart, her second top twenty hit in the United States.

Chart performance

References

1979 singles
Janie Fricke songs
Song recordings produced by Billy Sherrill
Columbia Records singles
1979 songs
Songs written by Johnny MacRae
Songs written by Bob Morrison (songwriter)